Wang Guangli (born November 1966), nicknamed "King Death" is a film director. A native of Sichuan—and a psychology professor by education—Wang eventually turned to film, making underground independent features that were often censored due to their political content. In 2001, however, Wang decided to obtain official state backing for his film Go For Broke, which, despite its support from the Shanghai Film Studio, was limited in its release—even domestically—due to its use of the Shanghainese dialect.

Wang has since shifted away from more serious works with the comedies Karmic Mahjong (2006) and Dangerous Games (2007).

Filmography

References

External links 
 
 
 Wang Guangli at the Chinese Movie Database

Film directors from Sichuan
Screenwriters from Sichuan
1966 births
Living people
Writers from Meishan
Educators from Sichuan